The First United Methodist Church is a historic church at 723 Center Street in Little Rock, Arkansas.  It is a large brick building, designed by Frank W. Gibb and built in 1899–1900.  It is one of the city's finest examples of Romanesque Revival architecture, with square towers at its corners, and its predominantly smooth brick exterior contrasted by rusticated granite trim.  The congregation, founded in 1831, is the oldest Methodist congregation in the city, and the mother congregation of many of its other Methodist establishments.  Its senior pastor is the Rev. David Freeman.

The building was listed on the National Register of Historic Places in 1986.

See also
National Register of Historic Places listings in Little Rock, Arkansas

References

External links
First United Methodist Church web site

Churches on the National Register of Historic Places in Arkansas
Romanesque Revival church buildings in Arkansas
Churches completed in 1896
Churches in Little Rock, Arkansas
National Register of Historic Places in Little Rock, Arkansas